Drag My Dad is a television series streamed by MTV on Facebook Watch, starting in 2019. The show is hosted by Bob the Drag Queen, winner of season 8 of RuPaul's Drag Race. The show features eight fathers who undergo drag makeovers and bond with their children in the process.

References

American LGBT-related web series
2019 web series debuts
Drag (clothing) television shows